Reginald William Thomas "Roy" Ingram (19 November 1900 – 1972) was a South African boxer who competed in the 1920 Summer Olympics and in the 1924 Summer Olympics. He was born in Belfast, United Kingdom of Great Britain and Ireland

In 1920 he was eliminated in the second round of the welterweight class after losing his fight to Trygve Stokstad. Four years later he was eliminated in the quarter-finals of the welterweight class after losing his fight to the eventual gold medalist Jean Delarge.

References

External links
Roy Ingram's profile at Sports Reference.com

1900 births
1972 deaths
Boxers from Belfast
Welterweight boxers
Olympic boxers of South Africa
Boxers at the 1920 Summer Olympics
Boxers at the 1924 Summer Olympics
Irish emigrants to South Africa
South African male boxers